Johannes Aulen (fl. late 15th century) was a German composer. Nothing is known about his biography.

A 3-voice Mass is present in several sources. Another composition, the 4-voice motet Salve virgo virginum attributed to him seems to be of a later composer of Josquin's generation.

References
Stanley Boorman and Eric Jas article in New Grove Dictionary of Music
H. Besseler's article in Musik in Geschichte und Gegenwart
M. Just: Der Mensuralkodex Mus. ms. 40021 der Staatsbibliothek Preussischer Kulturbesitz Berlin. (Tutzing, 1975)
A. Kirkman: The Three-Voice Mass in the Later Fifteenth and Early Sixteenth Centuries (New York, 1995)

External links

15th-century German people
15th-century German composers
German male composers